Edgewood is a historic farm complex located at Wingina, Nelson County, Virginia.  Structures located on the  property document its evolution as a plantation and farm since the late-18th century. It includes the main house ruins, a house built about 1790 and destroyed by fire in 1955; the circa 1820 Tucker Cottage; an 18th-century dovecote, dairy, and smokehouse; an 1828 icehouse; an early 19th-century corncrib; and a mid-19th-century barn or granary. Also on the property are a circa 1940s tenant house (now a woodworking shop) and machine shed, the Cabell family cemetery, and an original well.  The structures are all located along the gravel driveway.

It was listed on the National Register of Historic Places in 2006.

See also
Margaret Cabell Self, buried at Edgewood

References

Farms on the National Register of Historic Places in Virginia
National Register of Historic Places in Nelson County, Virginia
Buildings and structures in Nelson County, Virginia
Georgian architecture in Virginia
1790 establishments in Virginia